Hopea aequalis is a tree in the family Dipterocarpaceae, native to Borneo. The specific epithet aequalis means "equal" and refers to the lobes of the fruit's calyx.

Description
It has both attached and flying (detached) buttresses and also stilt roots. The bark is smooth.

Distribution and habitat
Hopea aequalis is endemic to Borneo.

Conservation
Hopea aequalis has been assessed as endangered on the IUCN Red List. It is threatened mainly by conversion of land for agriculture. It is also threatened by illegal logging for its timber. The species is found in some protected areas.

References

aequalis
Endemic flora of Borneo
Plants described in 1967
Taxonomy articles created by Polbot